Van Gogh by Numbers is a jazz album by Joe Locke (vibraphone) and Christos Rafalides (marimba). It was released on November 4, 2005 by Wire Walker with the album launch at the Percussive Arts Society International Convention.

Track listing
 "Van Gogh by Numbers" (Locke)
 "Sorayia" (Rafalides)
 "Love Is a Many Splendored Thing" (Sammy Fain/Paul Francis Webster)
 "Sword of Whispers" (Locke)
 "Pandora's Dance" (Rafalides)
 "Suite di Morfeo" (Locke):
 "Movement #1: Now I Lay Me Down"
 "Movement #2: Now in Darkness I Dream"
 "Movement #3: Waking Now, I Wonder"
 "Danzon En Primavera" (Rafalides)
 "Blue in Green" (Miles Davis/Bill Evans)

Personnel
 Joe Locke – vibes (marimba 5, 8)
 Christos Rafalides – marimba (vibes 5, 8)

References

External links
 Joe Locke's website
 Christos Rafalides's website

Jazz albums by American artists
2005 albums